Sarah Bouktit (born 27 August 2002) is a French female handball player who plays for French club Metz Handball.

She represented France in the 2019 European Women's U-17 Handball Championship, were she received silver. She was awarded to the All-Star Team, as best line player of the tournament.

In March 2022, she was called up to the France team for the qualifying matches for Euro-2022. She obtained her first selection with the senior team at the age of 19, on March 3, 2022 during the victory of France against Croatia.

Achievements
Youth European Championship:
Bronze Medalist: 2019

Individual awards
 All-Star Team Best Line player of the Youth European Championship: 2019

References

2002 births
Living people
French female handball players